Ken De Fauw (born 19 September 1991) is a Belgian cyclist active both in track and road cycling. He is the son of former national track cycling coach Marc De Fauw and the cousin of former cyclist Dimitri De Fauw.

Biography
He was born on 19 September 1991 in Ghent, Belgium. He is the son of Marc, a former track cycling coach, and he is a cousin of Dimitri. In 2013 he raced while working for his  master's degree in Industrial Sciences at Ghent University.

In 2017 he placed 29th at the 2017 .

Career achievements

Road cycling
2016
 2nd  Belgian Cup - GP Georges Lassaut Rummen
Junior
2011
 1st  Memorial Dimitri De Fauw U23

Track cycling
Junior
2007
 2nd team race (with Niels Van Laer),   U17
2008
 2nd team pursuit,   U19
2009
 7th team race (with Arne Van Snick), UEC European Track Championships U19
 2nd team pursuit,   U19
 3rd points race,   U19
2010
 3rd team race (with Moreno De Pauw),   U23
2011
 2nd 1000m,   U23
 3rd team pursuit,   U23
2013
 2nd team pursuit,   U23

References 

1991 births
Belgian male cyclists
Sportspeople from Ghent
Cyclists from East Flanders
Living people